Goonj may refer to the following films:

Goonj (1952 film), starring Suraiya
Goonj (1974 film), Bollywood film directed by S.U. Syed, starring Rakesh Roshan and Reena Roy
Goonj (1989 film), Bollywood film directed by Jalal Agha, starring Kumar Gaurav and Juhi Chawla
Goonj (NGO), established 1998, Indian humanitarian aid and development non-governmental organisation based in Delhi.
 Goonj, annual cultural festival of University Institute of Engineering and Technology, Panjab University, Chandigarh.